David Murray, 6th Viscount of Stormont (c. 1690 – 23 July 1748) was a Scottish peer, succeeding to the Viscountcy of Stormont on his father David's death in 1731 and holding it until his own death.  His mother was Marjory Scott, and among his brothers were the Earl of Mansfield and the Jacobite James Murray. The 6th Viscount was also tended towards Jacobitism, writing the unpublished poem An Elegy sacred to the Memory of John, Earl of Strathmore, who was killed in 1715, memorialising this Jacobite's death at the Battle of Sheriffmuir.

In 1723 he married Anne Stewart, only daughter and heiress of John Stewart of Innernytie, and they had two sons (including his heir, also named David Murray, 2nd Earl of Mansfield) and James, who died unmarried and two daughters Anne and Marjory. In 30 March 1799, King George III granted Anne and Marjory the place and precedency of the daughter of an Earl, hence making them Lady Anne and Lady Marjory respectively

Family tree

References

1690 births
1748 deaths
Viscounts in the Peerage of Scotland
Clan Murray